The 2009 All England Super Series is the 99th edition of the All England Open Badminton Championships and also the third tournament of the 2009 BWF Super Series. It was held from 3–8 March 2009 in Birmingham, England.

Final results

External links
All England Open Super Series 2009 at tournamentsoftware.com

 
All England Open Badminton Championships
Sports competitions in Birmingham, West Midlands
2009 BWF Super Series
March 2009 sports events in the United Kingdom